"Anymore" is a song co-written and recorded by American country music artist Travis Tritt.  It was released in September 1991 as the second single from his album It's All About to Change.  It peaked at number 1 in both the United States and Canada, becoming his second number-one hit in the United States, and his fourth number-one in Canada. The song was written by Tritt and Jill Colucci.

Content and history
Tritt co-wrote the song with Jill Colucci, who also wrote his 1990 hit "I'm Gonna Be Somebody", when the two were together on an airplane ride. Colucci presented Tritt with a melody and the two began writing lyrics together. As they had not finished writing the lyrics at the time the airplane landed, they reunited in the studio six weeks later to finish writing. The song is composed in the key of C major with a "moderately slow" tempo and main chord pattern of C-G-F-G.

Music video
The music video was directed by Jack Cole and was the first of a trilogy of music videos (the second being "Tell Me I Was Dreaming" in 1995, and the third being "If I Lost You" in 1998) that tell the story of a veteran named Mac Singleton, who uses a wheelchair. Tritt portrays Mac Singleton, who is struggling through his time at a rehabilitation clinic after being injured in the Vietnam War, and has nightmares about the war every night. He meets a friend named Al (portrayed by Barry Scott) after awakening from one of his nightmares. Singleton is also struggling from being away from his wife Annie.

The video was featured in CMT's 100 Greatest Music Videos in 2004, where it ranked at No. 64.

Personnel
Compiled from liner notes.

 Sam Bacco – timpani, percussion
 Richard Bennett – electric guitar
 Mike Brignardello – bass guitar
 Larry Byrom – acoustic guitar
 Mac McAnally – acoustic guitar solo
 Dana McVicker – background vocals
 Bobby Ogdin – piano, harpsichord
 Steve Turner – drums
 Billy Joe Walker Jr. – acoustic guitar
 Reggie Young – electric guitar, guitar solo

Chart positions
"Anymore" debuted on the US Billboard Hot Country Singles & Tracks for the week of September 14, 1991.

Year-end charts

References

1991 singles
Travis Tritt songs
Songs written by Travis Tritt
Songs written by Jill Colucci
Warner Records Nashville singles
1991 songs